Trần Văn Liễu is a former international table tennis player from Vietnam.

Table tennis career
He won a bronze medal at the 1959 World Table Tennis Championships in the Swaythling Cup (men's team event) for South Vietnam with Mai Văn Hòa, Lê Văn Tiết and Trần Cảnh Được.

He won an Asian Championship medal and two Asian Games medals.

See also
 List of table tennis players
 List of World Table Tennis Championships medalists

References

Vietnamese table tennis players
Asian Games gold medalists for Vietnam
Asian Games bronze medalists for Vietnam
Asian Games medalists in table tennis
Table tennis players at the 1958 Asian Games
Medalists at the 1958 Asian Games
World Table Tennis Championships medalists